Windsor Forge Mansion, also known as Windsor Place, is a historic home and national historic district located at Caernarvon Township, Lancaster County, Pennsylvania. The property was once owned by the well known local Van Leer family, who owned several nearby by Iron businesses. Dr. Bernardhus Van Leer with partners were listed as owners. The district includes four contributing buildings and three contributing objects. The buildings are the Ironmaster's Mansion, stone smokehouse (c. 1765), stone spring house (c. 1765), and stone summer kitchen / servant's quarters (c. 1765). The three objects are pieces by noted artist and poet Blanche Nevin (1841–1925), who purchased Windsor Forge Mansion in 1899. Her grandfather Robert Jenkins (1769–1848) had previously been ironmaster and congressman. The oldest section of the Ironmaster's Mansion was built about 1742; the western section was built about 1765, and the connecting middle section about 1815. A shed roof porch was added in 1899, at which time it was generally renovated. The house is  stories and built of stone.  Nevin added a studio to the house.

It was listed on the National Register of Historic Places in 1990.

See also 

 Samuel Van Leer
 Reading Furnace Historic District

References 

Houses on the National Register of Historic Places in Pennsylvania
Historic districts on the National Register of Historic Places in Pennsylvania
Federal architecture in Pennsylvania
Houses completed in 1742
Houses in Lancaster County, Pennsylvania
1742 establishments in Pennsylvania
National Register of Historic Places in Lancaster County, Pennsylvania